Moses Maverick (16111686) was a 17th-century English colonist who migrated to the Massachusetts Bay Colony and founded Marblehead, Massachusetts. He served as selectman for 14 years. Maverick Street, Maverick Cove, Maverick Court and Moses Maverick Square are named after him.

Biography 
Moses Maverick was born in Devon, England to Rev. John Maverick and Mary Gye. Moses Maverick's older brother is early Massachusetts colonist Samuel Maverick.

Maverick migrated to Dorchester, Massachusetts with his father, soon to become the first minister in Dorchester, in 1630. He became a freeman in 1634. Eventually, Maverick left Dorchester for Salem, settling in the outskirts of town in what was soon to become Marblehead. Through his efforts, Marblehead became a separate entity from Salem in 1649. In reward for these efforts, he was elected as one of the first selectmen in 1649, a position he would hold for fourteen years between 1649 and his death. He held various other local positions and was the town's leading figure.

Moses Maverick died in Marblehead in 1686 at the age of 74.

Personal life 
Moses Maverick married twice. First, to Remember Allerton, daughter to Isaac Allerton, who had come over on the Mayflower. His second wife was Eunice Cole and they were married by Governor John Endecott.

References

External links
Marblehead Magazine page for Moses Maverick
Wicked Local: Marblehead News article on Moses Maverick's 400th birthday

1611 births
1686 deaths
People from Marblehead, Massachusetts
People of colonial Massachusetts
Kingdom of England emigrants to Massachusetts Bay Colony
American city founders